The Marcel Robert Trophy is awarded annually to the Scholastic Player of the Year in the Quebec Major Junior Hockey League. The winner is the player who best combines on-ice performance with success in school.

Winners

External links
 QMJHL official site List of trophy winners.

Quebec Major Junior Hockey League trophies and awards